The 1942 United States Senate election in South Dakota took place on November 3, 1942. Incumbent Democratic Senator William J. Bulow ran for re-election to a third term. During the primary, Bulow was attacked for being insufficiently supportive of President Franklin Roosevelt's foreign policy and war preparedness. Former Governor Tom Berry, Bulow's chief opponent, drew a contrast between Bulow's isolationism and his support for Roosevelt's policies. In the end, Berry defeated Bulow in a landslide, and advanced to the general election, where he faced Harlan J. Bushfield, the incumbent Republican Governor of South Dakota. As Republicans gained ground nationwide, Bushfield defeated Berry in a landslide to pick up the seat for the Republican Party. Bushfield did not serve his full term, however; shortly before the 1948 U.S. Senate election, he died.

Democratic Primary

Candidates
 Tom Berry, former Governor of South Dakota
 William J. Bulow, incumbent U.S. Senator
 Edward Prchal, former member of the South Dakota Board of Regents

Results

Republican Primary

Candidates
 Harlan J. Bushfield, Governor of South Dakota
 Olive A. Ringsrud, Secretary of State of South Dakota

Results

General election

Results

References

South Dakota
1942
1942 South Dakota elections